The Atlantic, Tennessee and Ohio Railroad Company in North Carolina was incorporated under act of Tennessee on February 26, 1852, and under act of North Carolina on February 15, 1855, as Atlantic, Tennessee and Ohio Railroad Company. The name of the company was changed to Atlantic, Tennessee and Ohio Railroad Company in North Carolina on February 23, 1861.

Some time in 1863, the Confederate States of America dismantled the railroad and used it in construction of the Piedmont Railroad as a matter of military necessity. With the assistance of $147,000 in bonds of the State of North Carolina, authorized by act of the legislature ratified February 3, 1869, the railroad line was reconstructed. It was reopened on June 22, 1871.

The property of the Atlantic, Tennessee and Ohio Railroad Company in North Carolina was operated by its own organization from 1860 to 1863 and from June 22, 1871, to September 30, 1881, by the Charlotte, Columbia and Augusta Railroad Company from October 1, 1881, to April 30, 1886, by The Richmond and Danville Railroad Company from May 1, 1886, to June 14, 1892, and by the receivers of The Richmond and Danville Railroad Company from June 15, 1892, to June 30, 1894.

The Atlantic, Tennessee and Ohio Railroad Company in North Carolina was sold to Southern Railway Company on June 26, 1894. Southern Railway Company began to operate the property on July 1, 1894.

See also 

 Confederate railroads in the American Civil War
 Alexander Railroad

Notes

References
 Interstate Commerce Commission. Southern Ry. Co., Volume 37, Interstate Commerce Commission Valuation Reports, November 6, 1931. Washington: United States Government Printing Office, 1932. .

Defunct North Carolina railroads
Predecessors of the Southern Railway (U.S.)
Railway companies established in 1855
Railway companies disestablished in 1894
5 ft gauge railways in the United States
American companies established in 1855